The 1959 Southern Jaguars football team was an American football team that represented Southern University in the 1959 NCAA College Division football season. In their 24th season under head coach Ace Mumford, the Jaguars compiled an 8–2 record (7–0 against SWAC opponents), won the SWAC championship, and outscored all opponents by a total of 267 to 93. The team played its home games at University Stadium in Baton Rouge, Louisiana.

Schedule

References

Southern
Southern Jaguars football seasons
Southwestern Athletic Conference football champion seasons
Southern Jaguars football